La liceale, il diavolo e l'acquasanta (The high school student, the devil and the holy water) is a 1979 commedia sexy all'italiana directed by Nando Cicero. It is the fourth chapter in the "Liceale" film-series and the last starred by Gloria Guida. Unlike the previous films, it is an anthology film in which the three main actors of the series (Gloria Guida, Lino Banfi and Alvaro Vitali) star in three separate segments.

Cast 
 Gloria Guida: Luna
 Lino Banfi: Lino
 Alvaro Vitali: Carmelo Petralia
 Pippo Santonastaso: Pupù, the Devil
 Maria Luisa Serena: Rosaria
 Alberto Ercolani (alias Claudio Saint-Just): Ciclamino
 Tiberio Murgia: Commendatore
 Salvatore Baccaro: the primeval man

Related films 
La liceale (1975)   

La liceale nella classe dei ripetenti (1978) 
La liceale seduce i professori (1979)   

La liceale al mare con l'amica di papà (1980), without Gloria Guida

References

External links
 

1979 films
Commedia sexy all'italiana
Liceale films
Films directed by Nando Cicero
Italian anthology films
1970s sex comedy films
1979 comedy films
1970s Italian films